The 1986 Giro d'Italia was the 69th edition of the Giro d'Italia, one of cycling's Grand Tours. The Giro began in Palermo, with a prologue individual time trial on 12 May, and Stage 12 occurred on 23 May with a stage from Sinalunga. The race finished in Merano on 2 June.

Stage 12
23 May 1986 — Sinalunga to Siena,  (ITT)

Stage 13
24 May 1986 — Siena to Sarzana,

Stage 14
25 May 1986 — Savona to Sauze d'Oulx,

Stage 15
26 May 1986 — Sauze d'Oulx to Erba,

Stage 16
27 May 1986 — Erba to Foppolo,

Stage 17
28 May 1986 — Foppolo to Piacenza,

Stage 18
29 May 1986 — Piacenza to Cremona,  (ITT)

Stage 19
30 May 1986 — Cremona to Peio,

Stage 20
31 May 1986 — Peio to Bassano del Grappa,

Stage 21
1 June 1986 — Bassano del Grappa to Bolzano,

Stage 22
2 June 1986 — Merano to Merano,

References

1986 Giro d'Italia
Giro d'Italia stages